Matías Alejandro Quiroga (born April 14, 1986 in San Luis, Argentina) is an Argentine footballer currently playing for Independiente Rivadavia.

References
 
 

1986 births
Living people
Argentine footballers
Argentine expatriate footballers
Argentine Primera División players
Primera Nacional players
Torneo Argentino A players
Chilean Primera División players
Audax Italiano footballers
Unión de Santa Fe footballers
Club Atlético Patronato footballers
Gimnasia y Esgrima de Jujuy footballers
Club de Gimnasia y Esgrima La Plata footballers
Atlético de Rafaela footballers
Defensores de Belgrano footballers
Independiente Rivadavia footballers
Argentine expatriate sportspeople in Chile
Expatriate footballers in Chile
Association football forwards
People from San Luis, Argentina